Traces of Red is a 1992 neo noir erotic thriller film, directed by Andy Wolk and starring James Belushi, Lorraine Bracco and Tony Goldwyn. The film was released theatrically  by The Samuel Goldwyn Company on November 13, 1992.  After the limited theatrical release in the United States, the film became a surprise hit in the United States Home Video market; the film made 224.8% more revenue on home video than it did in theaters.

Lorraine Bracco used body double for the nude scene. Her performance in the film earned her a Razzie Award nomination for Worst Actress.

Plot
The film begins with Jack Dobson, a homicide detective from Palm Beach, flat on his back with a bullet in his chest. It is then told in flashback form, leading up to the events that led him to this fate.

Jack has been receiving threatening letters. He and his partner Steve Frayn conclude that the source must be a mob figure whom Jack is about to testify against in court. But another possibility is that someone could be causing trouble for Jack's brother, Michael, who is in an election campaign for public office.

Women begin turning up dead with lipstick traces left by the killer. A woman Jack has begun seeing, Ellen Schofield, could be involved. But when Ellen sees Jack leave a restaurant with a woman who soon becomes a victim, suspicion is cast toward Jack himself as the killer. Jack eventually reveals that he was raped as a child by his former 1st grade teacher, Gloria Wurtz. While speaking with Michael, Steve learns that it was by his own mother who raped Jack. Steve decides to go forward with his own investigation but, in the process, winds up having sex with Ellen, much to his wife's (who he earlier celebrated his seventh wedding anniversary with) and Jack's (who now sees him as a traitor) dismay. After Ellen turns up dead, Jack decides to take Beth (Steve's wife) with him to a secluded getaway home, immediately following Steve confiding in Jack that he trusted him. After finding evidence that Jack is indeed the killer, Steve and Michael rush to the getaway home where Jack and Beth are. Jack is holding Beth and is seemingly about to strangle her when Steve yells at Jack to freeze. Jack pushes Beth aside and draws his gun, but is shot by Steve before he can get off a shot. Then, Jack (in narrative form) says "I guess you probably thought that I was some kind of hero when you first saw me laying there, at the beginning. Wrong. But the story wasn't over ...... not yet." Eventually, Michael is revealed to be the real killer. Jack's murder was faked, as he wanted to give Michael a false sense of security that he was dead, and responsible for the murdered women. Michael is set up to seemingly be alone with a woman in a hotel room. After he attempts to strangle the woman, Steve bursts into the room with his gun drawn, and tells Michael to freeze. It is then revealed that Jack is not dead, much to Michael's shock. Jack tells Steven and the woman to leave the room, so that he can talk to his brother alone. As they are embracing, Michael manages to take Jack's gun. Michael then commits suicide by shooting himself in the temple. The movie concludes with Steve asking Jack if he's ready (after his brother's funeral), to which Jack replies, "I will be."

Cast
 James Belushi as Detective Jack Dobson
 Lorraine Bracco as Ellen Schofield
 Tony Goldwyn as Detective Steve Frayn
 Joe Lisi as Lieutenant J.C. Hooks
 William Russ as Michael Dobson
 Faye Grant as Beth Frayn
 Michelle Joyner as Morgan Cassidy
 Victoria Bass as Susan Dobson
 Melanie Tomlin as Amanda
 Jim Piddock as Mr. Martyn
 Ed Amatrudo as Emilio
 Danny Kamin as Prosecutor Dan Ayeroff
 Harriet Grinnell as Louise Dobson
 Lindsey Jayde Sapp as Nancy Frayn
 Mario Ernesto Sánchez as Tony Garidi
 Joe Hess as 'Minnesota'
 Will Knickerbocker as Tommy Hawkins
 Edgar Allan Poe IV as Ian Wicks
 Billy Garrigues as Phillip Norris
 Katherine Culliver as Kimberly Davis
 Renate Schlesinger as Ingrid
 Nick Xatzis as Theo (uncredited)

References

External links

1992 films
1990s mystery thriller films
1990s erotic drama films
American erotic thriller films
Films scored by Graeme Revell
Films directed by Andy Wolk
Films set in Florida
American police detective films
The Samuel Goldwyn Company films
American erotic drama films
1992 crime thriller films
1990s erotic thriller films
American mystery thriller films
1990s English-language films
1990s American films